The Arthurian gas fields are small natural gas producing areas in the UK sector of the southern North Sea, their names are associated with the legend of King Arthur. The fields started gas production from 1989 and several are now depleted and have been decommissioned.

The fields 
Mobil instigated the field naming convention using characters, people, places and objects associated with the legendary British King Arthur. Mobil applied it to its gas fields across the southern North Sea. The Arthurian fields span Quadrants 48, 49 and 53 from Arthur in the south east to Excalibur in the north west. 

The Arthurian fields and the reservoir parameters are as follows.    

Note: bcm = billion cubic metres, bcf = billion cubic feet

Developments 
The fields were developed with an array of platforms and subsea completions. Production from the fields was principally routed via existing infrastructure to the onshore Bacton gas terminal.     

The pipeline from Lancelot to Bacton is known as the LAPS pipeline (Lancelot Area Pipeline System).

The Lancelot installation also provided an export route for gas from the Durango and Waveney fields.

Production 
The peak and cumulative production of gas from the Arthurian fields was as follows. 

The gas production profile from Camelot Central South (in mcm) was as follows:

The gas production profile from Lancelot (in mcm) up to 2014 was as follows:
The gas production profile from Excalibur (in mcm) up to 2014 was as follows:The gas production profile from Gawain (in mcm) up to 2014 was as follows:

See also 

 Lincolnshire Offshore Gas Gathering System
Leman gas field
 Bacton gas terminal
List of oil and gas fields of the North Sea 
Planets gas fields 
Indefatigable gas field 
West Sole gas field 
Thames gas field

References 

North Sea energy
North Sea
Natural gas fields in the United Kingdom